Mark Ryder (born December 7, 1989) is an actor from Northern Ireland who was educated at Methodist College Belfast. He is most noted for his television role as Cesare Borgia in the historical drama series, Borgia.

Filmography

References

External links
 

1989 births
Living people
Male actors from Belfast
Male film actors from Northern Ireland
Male television actors from Northern Ireland
People educated at Methodist College Belfast